The term Dirac matter refers to a class of condensed matter systems which can be effectively described by the Dirac equation. Even though the Dirac equation itself was formulated for fermions, the quasi-particles present within Dirac matter can be of any statistics. As a consequence, Dirac matter can be distinguished in fermionic, bosonic or anyonic Dirac matter. Prominent examples of Dirac matter are Graphene, topological insulators, Dirac semimetals, Weyl semimetals, various high-temperature superconductors with -wave pairing and liquid Helium-3. The effective theory of such systems is classified by a specific choice of the Dirac mass, the Dirac velocity, the Dirac matrices and the space-time curvature. The universal treatment of the class of Dirac matter in terms of an effective theory leads to a common features with respect to the density of states, the heat capacity and impurity scattering.

Definition 
Members of the class of Dirac matter differ significantly in nature. However, all examples of Dirac matter are unified by similarities within the algebraic structure of an effective theory describing them.

General 

The general definition of Dirac matter is a condensed matter system where the quasi-particle excitations can be described in curved spacetime by the generalised Dirac equation:

In the above definition  denotes a covariant vector depending on the -dimensional momentum  ( space  time dimension),  is the vierbein describing the curvature of the space,  the quasi-particle mass and  the Dirac velocity.

Furthermore,  is the wavefunction. The unifying feature of all Dirac matter is the matrix structure of the equation describing the quasi-particle excitations.

In the limit where , i.e. the covariant derivative, conventional Dirac matter is obtained. However, this general definition allows the description of matter with higher order dispersion relations and in curved spacetime as long as the effective Hamiltonian exhibits the matrix structure specific to the Dirac equation.

Common (conventional) 

Here,  denotes the covariant derivative. As an example, for the flat metric, the energy of a free Dirac particle differs significantly from the classical kinetic energy where energy is proportional to momentum squared:

The Dirac velocity  gives the gradient of the  dispersion at large momenta ,  is the mass of particle or object. In the case of massless Dirac matter, such as the fermionic quasiparticles in graphene or Weyl semimetals, the energy-momentum relation is linear,

Therefore, conventional Dirac matter includes all systems that have a linear crossing or linear behavior in some region of the energy-momentum relation. They are characterised by features that resemble an 'X', sometimes tilted or skewed and sometimes with a gap between the upper  and lower  parts (the turning points of which become rounded if the origin of the gap is a mass term).

The general features and some specific examples of conventional Dirac matter are discussed in the following sections.

General properties of Dirac matter

Technological relevance and tuning of Dirac matter 

Dirac matter, especially fermionic Dirac matter has much potential for technological applications. For example, 2010's Nobel Prize in Physics was awarded to Andre Geim and Konstantin Novoselov "for groundbreaking experiments regarding the material graphene". Within the official press release of the Swedish Royal Academy of Science it is stated that

In general, the properties of massless fermionic Dirac matter can be controlled by shifting the chemical potential by means of doping or within a field effect setup. By tuning the chemical potential, it is possible to have a precise control of the number of states present, since the density of states varies in a well-defined way with energy.

Additionally, depending on the specific realization of the Dirac material, it may be possible to introduce a mass term  that opens a gap in the spectrum - a band gap. In general, the mass term is the result of breaking a specific symmetry of the system. The size of the band gap can be controlled precisely by controlling the strength of the mass term.

Density of states 
The density of states of -dimensional Dirac matter near the Dirac point scales as  where  is the particle energy. The vanishing density of states for quasiparticles in Dirac matter mimics semimetal physics for physical dimension . In the two-dimensional systems such as graphene and topological insulators, the density of states gives a V shape, compared with the constant value for massive particles with dispersion .

Experimental measurement of the density of states near the Dirac point by standard techniques such as scanning tunnelling microscopy often differ from the theoretical form due to the effects of disorder and interactions.

Specific heat 
Specific heat, the heat capacity per unit mass, describes the energy required to change the temperature of a sample. Therefore, for systems whose physical dimension is greater than 1, the specific heat can provide a clear signature of the underlying Dirac nature of the quasiparticles.

Landau quantization 
Landau quantization refers to the quantization of the cyclotron orbits of charged particles in magnetic fields. As a result, the charged particles can only occupy orbits with discrete energy values, called Landau levels. For 2-dimensional systems with a perpendicular magnetic field, the energy for Landau-levels for ordinary matter described the Schrödinger equation and Dirac matter are given by

Here,  is the cyclotron frequency which is linearly dependent of the applied magnetic field and the charge of the particle. There are two distinct features between the Landau level quantization for 2D Schrödinger fermions (ordinary matter) and 2D Dirac fermions. First, the energy for Schrödinger fermions is linearly dependent with respect to the integer quantum number , whereas it exhibits a square-root dependence for the Dirac fermions. This key difference plays an important role in the experimental verification of Dirac matter. Furthermore, for  there exists a 0 energy level for Dirac fermions which is independent of the cyclotron frequency  and with that of the applied magnetic field. For example, the existence of the zeroth Landau level gives rise to a quantum Hall effect where the Hall conductance in quantized at half-integer values.

Fermionic Dirac matter 
In the context of Fermionic quasiparticles, the Dirac velocity is identical to the Fermi velocity; in bosonic systems, no Fermi velocity exists, so the Dirac velocity is a more general property of such systems.

Graphene 
Graphene is a 2-dimensional crystalline allotrope of carbon, where the carbon atoms are arranged in a honeycomb lattice.
Each carbon atom forms -bonds to the three neighboring atoms that lie in the graphene plane at angles of 120. These bonds are mediated by three of carbon's four electrons while the fourth electron, which occupies a  orbital, mediates an out-of-plane -bond that leads to the electronic bands at the Fermi level. The unique transport properties and the semimetallic state of graphene are the result of the delocalized electrons occupying these pz orbitals.

At these two points, the electronic structure can be effectively described by the Hamiltonian

For graphene, the Dirac velocity is about  eV . An energy gap in the dispersion of graphene can be obtained from a low-energy Hamiltonian of the form 

which now contains a mass term . There are several distinct ways of introducing a mass term, and the results have different characteristics. The most practical approach for creating a gap (introducing a mass term) is to break the sublattice symmetry of the lattice where each carbon atom is slightly different to its nearest but identical to its next-nearest neighbours; an effect that may result from substrate effects.

Topological insulators 
A topological insulator is a material that behaves as an insulator in its interior (bulk) but whose surface contains conducting states. This property represents a non-trivial, symmetry protected topological order. As a consequence, electrons in topological insulators can only move along the surface of the material. In the bulk of a non-interacting topological insulator, the Fermi level is positioned within the gap between the conduction and valence bands. On the surface, there are special states within the bulk energy gap which can be effectively described by a Dirac Hamiltonian: 

However, if we rotate spin by a unitary operator, we will end up with the standard notation of Dirac Hamiltonian, .   
Such Dirac cones emerging on the surface of 3-dimensional crystals were observed in experiment, e.g.: bismuth selenide (BiSe), tin telluride (SnTe) and many other materials.

Transition metal dichalcogenides (TMDCs) 

The low-energy properties some semiconducting transition metal dichalcogenide monolayers, can be described by a two-dimensional massive (gapped) Dirac Hamiltonian with an additional term describing a strong spin–orbit coupling: 

The spin-orbit coupling  provides a large spin-splitting in the valence band and  indicates the spin degree of freedom. Transition metal dichalcogenide monolayers are often discussed in reference to potential applications in valleytronics.

Weyl semimetals 
Weyl semimetals, for example tantalum arsenide (TaAs) and related materials, strontium silicide (SrSi) have a Hamiltonian that is very similar to that of graphene, but now includes all three Pauli matrices and the linear crossings occur in 3D:

Since all three Pauli matrices are present, there is no further Pauli matrix that could open a gap in the spectrum and Weyl points are therefore topologically protected. Tilting of the linear cones so the Dirac velocity varies leads to type II Weyl semimetals.
One distinct, experimentally observable feature of Weyl semimetals is that the surface states form Fermi arcs since the Fermi surface does not form a closed loop.

Dirac semimetals 
In crystals that are symmetric under inversion and time reversal, electronic energy bands are two-fold degenerate. This degeneracy is referred to as Kramers degeneracy. Therefore, semimetals with linear crossings of two energy bands (two-fold degeneracy) at the Fermi energy exhibit a four-fold degeneracy at the crossing point. The effective Hamiltonian for these states can be written as 

This has exactly the matrix structure of Dirac matter. Examples of experimentally realised Dirac semimetals are sodium bismuthide (NaBi) and cadmium arsenide (CdAs)

Bosonic Dirac matter 

While historic interest focussed on fermionic quasiparticles that have potential for technological applications, particularly in electronics, the mathematical structure of the Dirac equation is not restricted to the statistics of the particles. This has led to recent development of the concept of bosonic Dirac matter.

In the case of bosons, there is no Pauli exclusion principle to confine excitations close to the chemical potential (Fermi energy for fermions) so the entire Brillouin zone must be included. At low temperatures, the bosons will collect at the lowest energy point, the -point of the lower band. Energy must be added to excite the quasiparticles to the vicinity of the linear crossing point.

Several examples of Dirac matter with fermionic quasi-particles occur in systems where there is a hexagonal crystal lattice; so bosonic quasiparticles on an hexagonal lattice are the natural candidates for bosonic Dirac matter. In fact, the underlying symmetry of a crystal structure strongly constrains and protects the emergence of linear band crossings. Typical bosonic quasiparticles in condensed matter are magnons, phonons, polaritons and plasmons.

Existing examples of bosonic Dirac matter include transition metal halides such as CrX (X= Cl, Br, I), where the magnon spectrum exhibits linear crossings, granular superconductors in a honeycomb lattice and hexagonal arrays of semiconductor microcavities hosting microcavity polaritons with linear crossings. Like graphene, all these systems have an hexagonal lattice structure.

Anyonic Dirac materials 
Anyonic Dirac matter is a hypothetical field which is rather unexplored to date. An anyon is a type of quasiparticle that can only occur in two-dimensional systems. Considering bosons and fermions, the interchange of two particles contributes a factor of 1 or -1 to the wave function. In contrast, the operation of exchanging two identical anyons causes a global phase shift. Anyons are generally classified as abelian or non-abelian, according to whether the elementary excitations of the theory transform under an abelian representation of the braid group or a non-abelian one. Abelian anyons have been detected in connection to the fractional quantum Hall effect. The possible construction of anyonic Dirac matter relies on the symmetry protection of crossings of anyonic energy bands. In comparison to bosons and fermions the situation gets more complicated as translations in space do not necessarily commute. Additionally, for given spatial symmetries, the group structure describing the anyon strongly depends on the specific phase of the anyon interchange. For example, for bosons, a rotation of a particle about 2 i.e., 360, will not change its wave function. For anyons, an even higher degree of rotation can be necessary, e.g., 6, 8, etc., to leave the wave function invariant.

See also
 Dirac cone

Further reading

References 

Condensed matter physics